This is a list of singles that have peaked in the top 10 of the French Singles Chart in 2020. 100 singles were in the top 10 this year which 14 were on the number-one spot.

Top 10 singles

Entries by artists

The following table shows artists who achieved two or more top 10 entries in 2020. The figures include both main artists and featured artists and the peak position in brackets.

See also
2020 in music
List of number-one hits of 2020 (France)

References

Top
France top 10
Top 10 singles in 2020
France 2020